The Philippines participated at the 20th Southeast Asian Games held in Brunei from 7 to 15 August 1999.

SEA Games performance
The Philippines fell to fifth place in the overall medal tally, their lowest finish since joining the SEA Games in 1977. The Filipinos failed to win a gold medal in swimming for the first time, returning with a single gold in athletics. A harvest of four golds came from Taekwondo and Billiards. The Filipinos picked up two golds each in boxing, golf and shooting. World pool champion Efren 'Bata' Reyes and golfer Gerald Rosales were the only Filipino double gold medalists in the 1999 edition of the Games.

The Manila Metrostars of the ABS-CBN-funded Metropolitan Basketball Association (MBA) represented the Philippines for their basketball campaign. The Nationals captured their fifth straight basketball gold, defeating main rival Thailand, 89–69.

Philippine Olympic Committee president Celso Dayrit announced a four-year intensive elite sports development plan which the POC will undertake.

Medalists

Gold

Silver

Bronze

Multiple

Medal summary

By sports

References

External links
http://www.olympic.ph

Southeast Asian Games
Nations at the 1999 Southeast Asian Games
1999